Canadian singer Bryan Adams has released 18 studio releases, six compilation albums, two soundtrack albums, six live albums, and 74 singles. After the success of his debut single, "Let Me Take You Dancing" (1979), Adams signed a recording contract with A&M Records. Bryan Adams (1980), his debut album, peaked at number 69 on the Canadian RPM Albums Chart. Adams followed this with You Want It You Got It (1981), which peaked at number 118 on the Billboard 200 and was certified gold in Canada. Cuts Like a Knife, his third release, became his first successful work outside Canada. The album charted within the top 10 in Canada and the United States and was certified three-times platinum by the Canadian Recording Industry Association (CRIA) and platinum by the Recording Industry Association of America (RIAA). Reckless (1984), his fourth studio album, selling over 12 million copies worldwide and featured the hit singles "Run to You", "Heaven" and "Summer of '69". In 1987, he released Into the Fire, which reached platinum status in the United States and triple-platinum in Canada.

Adams entered the 1990s with the release of Waking Up the Neighbours (1991), which contained "(Everything I Do) I Do It for You", the theme song for the film Robin Hood: Prince of Thieves. It went on to sell more than 15 million copies worldwide, making it Adams's most successful song, and one of the best-selling singles of all time. The album was sold in approximately 16 million copies, including being certified diamond in Canada. He also released his first greatest hits compilation, So Far So Good, in 1993. This album topped the charts in nine countries and was certified six-times platinum and seven-times platinum by the RIAA and CRIA respectively. His seventh studio album, 18 til I Die, was released in 1996. It sold five million copies worldwide and was certified platinum in the United States. MTV Unplugged, an acoustic live album released in 1997, reached the top 10 in four countries while selling two million copies in Europe. Adams' eighth studio album, On a Day Like Today (1998), was certified double-platinum by the CRIA and platinum by the IFPI Platinum Europe Awards. His second compilation album, The Best of Me (1999), sold two million copies in Europe and went three-times platinum in Canada.

Spirit: Stallion of the Cimarron (2002) was certified gold by the RIAA and included the hit single "Here I Am". Room Service (2004), his ninth studio album, peaked at number 134 on the Billboard 200 and sold only 44,000 copies in the United States. However, it topped the album charts in Germany and Switzerland. Adams' third greatest hits compilation, Anthology, was released in 2005. 11 (2008), Adams' tenth studio album, peaked at number 80 on the Billboard 200 and became his third number-one album in Canada. Although it did not receive any certifications in Canada or the United Kingdom, the album sold over half-a-million units worldwide. In 2015, the thirteenth studio album Get Up was released; it reached the first position of the ranking in Switzerland, the second position in the UK and the third position in Germany. In September 2017, Adams announced via social media the release of a new compilation called Ultimate featuring 19 of his greatest hits and two new songs, "Please Stay" and "Ultimate Love". Shine a Light is the Canadian singer-songwriter's 14th studio album, which was released on March 1, 2019,. The album debuted at number one on the Canadian Albums Chart.; second place in the United Kingdom,  Switzerland, Austria and New Zealand; the third position in Germany. According to the RIAA, Adams' album and singles sales have been certified at over 22 million copies while globally, he has sold between 75 and 100 million records.

Albums

Studio albums

Special self-released digital studio albums

Live albums

Special self-released digital live albums

Compilation albums

Extended plays

Singles

1970s–1980s

1990s

2000s

2010s

Notes
 A  "Let Me Take You Dancing" peaked at 18 on the RPM Dance/Urban Chart, but peaked only at 90 on their singles chart.
 B  According to co-writer Jim Vallance, "Christmas Time" did not chart on the RPM chart, but instead on a chart known as The Record.
 C  "On a Day Like Today" peaked at 14 on the Billboard Canadian Singles Chart in 1998.
 D  "Don't Give Up" charted in Canada only on the RPM Dance/Urban chart at 9.

2020s

Guest appearances

Songwriting credits

See also
 Bryan Adams videography
 List of diamond-certified albums in Canada

References
General

 Bryan Adams discography
 
 
 

Specific

External links
 
 

Discographies of Canadian artists
Discography
Rock music discographies
Pop music discographies